The German Free Software License (Deutsche Freie Software Lizenz) is a license of open-source nature with the same flavors as the GNU GPL but governed by German law. This makes the license easily acceptable to German authorities. The D-FSL is available in German and in English. Both versions are equally binding.

German court ruled in 2006 that the GNU GPL was indeed enforceable.

References

External links 
  German Free Software License in english

Free and open-source software licenses
Copyleft software licenses